Lago Cardiel is a lake in Patagonia, Argentina, between the Andean Cordillera and the South Atlantic.

References
 Sistema Nacional de Información Hídrica: Lago Cardiel 
ETH Zurich Climate Geology Project Lago Cardiel

Lakes of Santa Cruz Province, Argentina
Lakes